Iha may refer to:

James Iha, American rock musician
Iha Fuyu, Japanese scholar
Iha language, a Papuan language spoken on the Bomberai Peninsula
Iha language (Maluku) or Saparua language, an Austronesian language spoken in the Mulukus
Iha Castle, a Ryukyuan gusuku on Okinawa Island
Iha Shell Mound, an archaeological site on Okinawa Island

See also
IHA (disambiguation), several acronyms